Luke Waterworth (born 20 June 1996) is a professional rugby league footballer who plays as a  for the Swinton Lions in the Betfred Championship.

Playing career
He started his amateur career with Ince Rose Bridge.

Wigan Warriors
He was previously contracted to the Wigan Warriors in the Super League.

Swinton Lions
He has spent time on loan at Swinton Lions in the Championship.

References

External links
Swinton Lions profile
 Wigan Warriors profile

1996 births
Living people
English rugby league players
Rugby league hookers
Swinton Lions players
Wigan Warriors players